Razumny was one of 29 s (officially known as Project 7) built for the Soviet Navy during the late 1930s. Originally named Prochny, she was renamed Razumny before completion in 1941, and was assigned to the Pacific Fleet.  About a year after the German invasion of Russia in June 1941, she was ordered to join the Northern Fleet, sailing through the Arctic Ocean. Together with several other destroyers, Razumny left the Soviet Far East in July 1942 and arrived in Murmansk three months later where she began escorting convoys, both Allied ones from Britain and the United States and local ones in the White and Barents Seas. The ship was badly damaged by German bombs while she was refitting in 1943 and was under repairs for five months. Razumny spent most of the rest of the war on convoy escort duties, although she did bombard a German-occupied town during the Petsamo–Kirkenes Offensive of October 1944.

After the war Razumny was modernized between 1954 and 1957 and was briefly reclassified as a target ship in 1960 before she became an accommodation ship later that year. Again reclassified as a target ship in 1962, she was listed for disposal in 1963 and scrapped.

Design and description
Having decided to build the large and expensive   destroyer leaders, the Soviet Navy sought Italian assistance in designing smaller and cheaper destroyers.

Their crew numbered 197 officers and sailors in peacetime and 236 in wartime. The designers had been conservative in rating the turbines and many, but not all, of the ships handily exceeded their designed speed during their sea trials. Others fell considerably short of it. Razumny reached  during trials in 1957.

As built, the Gnevny-class ships mounted four  B-13 guns in two pairs of superfiring single mounts fore and aft of the superstructure. Anti-aircraft defense was provided by a pair of  34-K AA guns in single mounts and a pair of  21-K AA guns as well as two  DK or DShK machine guns. They carried six  torpedo tubes in two rotating triple mounts; each tube was provided with a reload. The ships could also carry a maximum of either 60 or 95 mines and 25 depth charges. The ships were equipped with two K-1 paravanes intended to destroy mines and a pair of depth-charge throwers.

Construction and service 
Major components for the ship that became Razumny were laid down at Shipyard No. 200 (named after 61 Communards) in Nikolayev on 7 July 1936 as yard number 1075 and were then railed to Vladivostok for completion at Shipyard No. 202 (Dalzavod) where the ship was laid down again on 16 August 1937 as Prochny. She was launched on 30 June 1939 and was renamed Razumny on 25 August before she was completed on 20 October 1941 and commissioned on 7 November into the Pacific Fleet. As a result of the weakness of the Northern Fleet and the importance of the Arctic convoys of World War II, Stavka decided to transfer several modern ships from the Pacific to the Northern Fleet via the Northern Sea Route. Led by the destroyer leader , Razumny and her sister ships  and  departed Vladivostok on 15 July 1942, although Revnostny collided with a freighter on the 18th and had to return to Vladivostok. They stopped at Tiksi on 14 August for a few days, resumed the voyage five days later and arrived off Kola Bay on 14 October.

Razumny and two other destroyers were sent to rescue the crew of her sister  on 21 November after the ship had broken in half in a storm. Razumny only rescued one man because she was assigned to guard the other ships as they rescued the rest of the crew. On 25–27 December, the destroyer helped to escort Convoy JW 51A. In response to a radio intelligence report of a German convoy of two transports with a destroyer and two smaller escorts steaming east from Tromsø, Norway, Baku and Razumny made a night sortie on 20 January 1943. After closing the range, Baku fired four torpedoes at what the Soviets believed was the lead transport, all of which missed. As her lookouts reported explosions, the latter was believed sunk, and both Soviet warships turned their guns against what was believed to be the second transport, without result. The German vessels returned fire without damaging Baku, and the engagement ended after seven minutes when visibility deteriorated, allowing the Soviet ships to retreat behind a smokescreen laid by Razumny. She escorted a small convoy from the White Sea to Kola Bay on 3–4 February and began a refit on the 25th. While still in drydock on 3 April, the ship was struck by one bomb that penetrated through the entire ship before detonating next to the hull; another bomb exploded  from the side of the ship. One crewman was killed and three were wounded; repairs were completed on 25 June.

Razumny spent the next six months escorting local convoys, often between Murmansk and Arkhangelsk. She helped to escort Convoy JW 54A on 24–25 November and Convoy JW 55B on 28–30 December. The ship and three other destroyers made an unsuccessful attempt to intercept German supply ships off the Norwegian coast on 20–22 January 1944. Razumny was one of the escorts for Convoy JW 56A on 27–29 January and she spent most of the next year escorting Allied convoys, notably Convoys JW 57, JW 58, JW 59, JW 60, JW 61, RA 61, JW 62 and JW 63 as well as local ones. During the Petsamo–Kirkenes Offensive, Razumny bombarded the Norwegian town of Vardö on 26 October. Norwegian fishing boat Spurven was sunk at Vardo. Her last escort mission was on 20 January 1945.

After the war, the ship had a lengthy modernization from 1954 to 30 June 1957. She stricken from the Navy List and redesignated as target ship TsL-29 on 6 February 1960 and reclassified as accommodation ship PKZ-3 on 15 September. Although the ship was listed for disposal on 4 July 1960, she was converted into target ship SM-14 on 23 October 1962. The hulk was discarded on 4 May 1963 and subsequently scrapped over the next year.

Citations

Sources

Further reading
 

Gnevny-class destroyers
1939 ships
Ships built at Shipyard named after 61 Communards
Cold War destroyers of the Soviet Union